Mawson Escarpment is a flat-topped, west-facing escarpment which extends in a north–south direction for  along the east side of Lambert Glacier in Antarctica. It was discovered by Flying Officer J. Seaton, Royal Australian Air Force, of the Australian National Antarctic Research Expeditions while on a reconnaissance flight in November, 1956, and was named by the Antarctic Names Committee of Australia for Sir Douglas Mawson.

On the northern end is the Barkell Platform.

References

Mountain ranges of Antarctica
Escarpments of Antarctica
Landforms of Mac. Robertson Land